One Piece is a Japanese media franchise created by Eiichirō Oda in 1997. The initial manga, written and illustrated by Eiichirō Oda, has been serialized in Shueisha's Weekly Shōnen Jump magazine since July 22, 1997, and has been collected into 101 tankōbon volumes. As of January 2021, the manga has sold over 480 million copies worldwide, making it the best-selling manga series in history. It became the best-selling manga for the eleventh consecutive year in 2018.

The manga has been adapted into a festival film produced by Production I.G in 1998, and an anime series produced by Toei Animation, which began broadcasting in Japan in 1999. Additionally, Toei has developed 13 animated feature films, original video animations, and 13 television specials. Several companies have developed various types of merchandise like trading card games and numerous video games. In addition, there has been other material released based on the franchise, such as spin-off manga, light novels, anime comics, artbooks, soundtracks, databooks, magazines, attractions, and theatrical plays.

Manga

Ongoing series

Limited series

One shots

Comic strips

Collected editions

Anime

Television

Ongoing series

Specials

Other

Films

Shorts

Live-action series

Video games

Mobile games

Books

Novels

Databooks

Color Walks

Animation logbooks

Special volumes

Other

Magazines

Plays

Music

Miscellaneous

Theme park attractions and other establishments

Restaurants

Notes

References

Media
 
One Piece